Derek Dooley may refer to:

Derek Dooley (American football) (born 1968), former head American football coach at Louisiana Tech University and the University of Tennessee
Derek Dooley (footballer) (1929–2008), English football player and manager